The Peter Tufts House (formerly and incorrectly known as the Cradock House) is a Colonial American house located in Medford, Massachusetts. It is thought to have been built between 1677 and 1678. Past historians considered it to be the oldest brick house in the United States, although that distinction belongs to Bacon's Castle, the 1665 plantation home of Virginian Arthur Allen.  It is also believed to be, possibly, the oldest surviving house in the U.S. with a gambrel roof.

Its end chimneys were incorporated into the walls, which is unusual for the time and area of its construction, and its "separate flues are brought together in the gables. The steep main roof slope (51°) is truncated at the top to form
one of the earliest-known gambrel roofs."

History
The house has been called the "fort" and the "garrison house" because of its thick walls and portholes. For many years it was believed that the house was built by Mathew Cradock, one of 35 founding members of the Massachusetts Bay Company. He reputedly owned the first wooden toll bridge in America (1632), but Cradock only owned the land and never even visited America. In 1677, Richard Russell of Charlestown sold the land with "one dwelling house and barn" to Peter Tufts [Sr.] of Charlestown, although a prior agreement may have been made, with Tufts Sr. likely already settled on the land.

The house was probably built by Peter Tufts, who sold it to his son, Peter (Captain) Tufts Jr. in 1680. The brick mason was William Bucknam, brought over in 1632 from Chelsea, England to build the house. It is the son for whom the house is named.  In 1728, the eastern side of the property was sold to Edward Oakes of Malden.

In 1887, Samuel Lawrence saved the house from demolition when he purchased it as a wedding gift for his daughter. The interior was remodeled at this time in the Colonial Revival style. Only the support beams and parts of the staircase were kept intact from the original period. Much of the exterior remains original, except the front porch was added between 1889 and 1900.

In 1892, when the City of Medford was incorporated, an image of the house was used in its city seal. The house was purchased for $9,700 by William Sumner Appleton with donations. He offered it to the Medford Historical Society, but they said they were unable to care for it at that time. In 1930, ownership was transferred to the Society for the Preservation of New England Antiquities (now Historic New England). In 1982, it was purchased by the Medford Historical Society, which now maintains the property.

Charles Tufts (1781–1876), a descendant of Peter Tufts Sr., would later donate land in Medford for the campus of Tufts University.

See also
 Peter and Oliver Tufts House
 List of the oldest buildings in Massachusetts
 National Register of Historic Places listings in Medford, Massachusetts
 List of National Historic Landmarks in Massachusetts

References

Houses completed in 1678
Houses in Medford, Massachusetts
National Historic Landmarks in Massachusetts
Houses on the National Register of Historic Places in Medford, Massachusetts
1678 establishments in Massachusetts